Borche Manevski (born 5 July 1985) is a Macedonian football player who currently plays for FK Pelister.

Club career 
Born in Bitola, his career started in local FK Pelister in 2004. In January 2006, he moved to Poland to play in the Ekstraklasa club Górnik Łęczna, where he stayed one and a half seasons.  In 2007 returned to FK Pobeda but, after six months, went to another Macedonian club FK Milano Kumanovo.  In January 2009 he signed with the Serbian Superliga club FK Banat Zrenjanin.  At the end of the 2008–09 season, Banat got relegated.  Manevski played in the 2009–10 Serbian First League and at the end of the season he returned to his native Macedonia to play for Macedonian First League runners-up FK Rabotnički.  Immediately in his first season he caused sensation by being voted as the Best player of the first half of the 2010–11 season by the internet portal MacedonianFootball.com becoming the first player to receive the award. After a sensational season in the First Macedonian League, he transferred to Chainat Hornbill, Thailand.

International career 
After playing for the U-17 and U-19 teams, he was included in the Macedonia national under-21 football team qualifications for the 2006 UEFA European Under-21 Football Championship where he played as an attacking central midfielder.

Manevski made his debut for the Macedonian national team at a tournament played in Iran in November 2005.
Five years later, on 3 December 2010, Manevski was selected returned to the Macedonian squad to play a friendly against China on 26 December 2010.

References

External sources
 Profile at Rabotnicki's website 
 Profile at MacedonianFootball 
 

1985 births
Living people
Sportspeople from Bitola
Association football midfielders
Macedonian footballers
North Macedonia international footballers
FK Pelister players
FK Pobeda players
Górnik Łęczna players
FK Milano Kumanovo players
FK Banat Zrenjanin players
FK Rabotnički players
FK Vardar players
Borche Manevski
Borche Manevski
Balzan F.C. players
Pembroke Athleta F.C. players
KF Ballkani players
Macedonian First Football League players
Ekstraklasa players
Serbian SuperLiga players
Serbian First League players
Borche Manevski
Maltese Premier League players
Football Superleague of Kosovo players
Macedonian Second Football League players
Macedonian expatriate footballers
Expatriate footballers in Poland
Macedonian expatriate sportspeople in Poland
Expatriate footballers in Serbia
Expatriate footballers in Thailand
Macedonian expatriate sportspeople in Thailand
Expatriate footballers in Malta
Macedonian expatriate sportspeople in Malta
Expatriate footballers in Kosovo
Macedonian expatriate sportspeople in Kosovo